

Outdoor sculptures

 Circle with Towers, University of Texas at Austin
 Clock Knot, University of Texas at Austin
 The Family Group, University of Texas at Austin
 Littlefield Fountain, University of Texas at Austin
 Monochrome for Austin, University of Texas at Austin
 The Seven Mustangs, University of Texas at Austin
 Square Tilt, University of Texas at Austin
 Statue of Albert Sidney Johnston (Texas State Cemetery)
 Statue of Albert Sidney Johnston (University of Texas at Austin)
 Statue of Barbara Jordan (Austin–Bergstrom International Airport)
 Statue of Barbara Jordan (University of Texas at Austin)
 Statue of Cesar Chavez, University of Texas at Austin
 Statue of George Washington
 Statue of Jefferson Davis, formerly installed on the University of Texas at Austin campus
 Statue of Jim Hogg
 Statue of John Henninger Reagan
 Statue of Martin Luther King Jr., University of Texas at Austin
 Statue of Robert E. Lee
 Statue of Woodrow Wilson
 Stevie Ray Vaughan Memorial
 The Torchbearers, University of Texas at Austin
 Willie Nelson statue, Block 21

Texas State Capitol
Sculptures installed inside the Texas State Capitol include Sam Houston and Stephen F. Austin. Sculptures installed outside the Capitol include:

 Confederate Soldiers Monument
 Disabled American Veterans of Texas Monument
 Heroes of the Alamo Monument
 Hood's Texas Brigade Monument
 Korean War Veterans Memorial
 Pearl Harbor Monument
 Strengthen the Arm of Liberty Monument
 Tejano Monument
 Ten Commandments Monument
 Terry's Texas Rangers Monument
 Texas African American History Memorial
 Texas Capitol Vietnam Veterans Monument
 Texas Cowboy Monument
 Texas Peace Officers' Memorial
 Texas Pioneer Woman Monument
 Texas World War II Memorial
 The Hiker
 Tribute to Texas Children Monument
 Veterans of the 36th Infantry, Texas National Guard Monument
 Volunteer Firemen Monument
 World War I Monument

Paintings
 Dawn at the Alamo (1905), Texas State Capitol
 Larry Monroe Forever Bridge
 Surrender of Santa Anna (1886), Texas State Capitol
 The Battle of San Jacinto, Texas State Capitol

External links
 

Public art
Culture of Austin, Texas
Austin, Texas

Tourist attractions in Austin, Texas